Avalanche is a 1951 French drama film directed by Raymond Segard and starring Frank Villard, Gaby Sylvia and José de Almeyda.

Cast
 Frank Villard as Edouard Bouchard  
 Gaby Sylvia as Wanda Bouchard 
 José de Almeyda as Rémy Couttet  
 José Fabert 
 Julienne Paroli as Mme Coutet

References

Bibliography 
 Rège, Philippe. Encyclopedia of French Film Directors, Volume 1. Scarecrow Press, 2009.

External links 
 

1951 films
1951 drama films
French drama films
1950s French-language films
French black-and-white films
1950s French films